Wuyuan County, is a county with 224,809 inhabitants (2020) under the administration of Baynnur, Inner Mongolia.

Climate

References

External links

County-level divisions of Inner Mongolia
Bayannur